The 2013 Colorado Rapids season was the club's eighteenth season of existence, and their eighteenth season in Major League Soccer, the top tier of the American and Canadian soccer pyramids.

Background

Review 

The 2013 Colorado Rapids would see massive changes made to the team. All-time leading goal scorer Conor Casey was released and Omar Cummings would be traded during the offseason, the Forward duo combining for 89 goals in the Rapids' careers.  The Midfield pairing of Jeff Larentowicz and long-time Captain Pablo Mastroeni would be broken up, as well. Larentowicz was traded in the offseason and Mastroeni was traded during the summer of 2013. With the majority of the 2010 MLS Champions team gone (only 5 players remaining on the squad), the team looked considerably different. Coach Oscar Pareja wanting a squad of younger, more athletic players. Colorado brought in US National Team Forward Edson Buddle, along with several South American players who had played for their National Teams.  2013 would also see Rapids' Homegrown Player, 19-year-old Shane O'Neill, become a valuable member of the US U-20 National Team leading up to and during the 2013 U-20 World Cup in Turkey.

Offseason 

The Colorado Rapids' offseason began with the release of 9 players in November. Forward Conor Casey, Midfielders Edu and Joseph Nane, Defenders Tyson Wahl, Hunter Freeman, and Luis Zapata, and Goalkeeper Ian Joyce all had their options declined. Tyrone Marshall and Scott Palguta's contracts expired and they were not re-signed. Midfielder Jamie Smith's contract also expired, however, he returned to the Rapids' preseason training camp and then was re-sign by Colorado.

The Rapids' added several players during the offseason via trade, including Forward Atiba Harris from Vancouver Whitecaps FC for a 2015–2016 International Roster Spot.  Colorado also traded their 1st Round 2013 MLS Supplemental Draft pick to the LA Galaxy for US International Forward Edson Buddle.  Later in December, Forward Omar Cummings was traded to the Houston Dynamo for Nathan Sturgis and allocation money.  Cummings narrowly missed being reunited with fellow 2010 Cup Champion, Macoumba Kandji, who had been traded to Houston the previous year.  Kandji refused a contract extension in order to play in Europe.  At the 2012 MLS Re-Entry Draft, Colorado selected Eric Avila with the 6th pick of the 1st round in the 2nd stage.

In January, on the day before the 2013 MLS SuperDraft, Midfielder Jeff Larentowicz was traded to the Chicago Fire.  The trade would involve an exchange of draft picks, Colorado receiving the 11th overall pick and Chicago receiving the 30th overall pick.  Chicago had traded the 30th overall pick to Colorado during the 2012 MLS season for Wells Thompson.  The following day, the Rapids drafted Forward Deshorn Brown (6th overall), Midfielder Dillon Powers (11th overall from Chicago), and Defender Kory Kindle (25th overall).  Ecuadorian International Defender Diego Calderón and Chilean International Midfielder Kevin Harbottle were signed to International Roster Spots.  Dillon Serna was signed as the Rapids' 3rd Homegrown Player in the lineup, joining US Youth International Shane O'Neill and Davy Armstrong.  Colorado traded the rights to Eric Avila to Chivas USA, in exchange for the rights to Nick LaBrocca.  Having originally been drafted by Colorado in 2007, LaBrocca would eventually sign with the Rapids for a second time.  During the 2013 MLS Supplemental Draft, Colorado selected Brenton Griffiths with the 25th overall pick.  Though he was drafted on January 22, Griffiths didn't sign with the Rapids until April 30.

On January 25, Colorado announced the signing of Cameroonian Youth International Charles Eloundou on a one-year loan from AS Fortuna de Mfou in Cameroon.  Colorado had won the rights to sign Eloundou in a weighted lottery.  Eloundou has yet to wear a Rapids' jersey, however, undergoing a lengthy battle with the Cameroonian side over the loan deal.  The ordeal would later cost the Rapids even more.  After several weeks of training with the club during the summer, US Youth International Conor Doyle tried to sign with Colorado on loan from Derby County in England.  MLS decided that Doyle must enter a weighted lottery and that Colorado was ineligible due to winning the lottery rights to Eloundou.  The weighted lottery rights to Doyle would be won by D.C. United.

In February, Colorado added Goalkeeper Clint Irwin on a free transfer from the Charlotte Eagles.  The Rapids also added the 1st overall 2010 MLS SuperDraft pick Danny Mwanga in a trade with the Portland Timbers for a 1st round 2015 MLS SuperDraft pick.

A series of injuries started the season off on the wrong foot for the Rapids.  New Forward Edson Buddle injured his knee during training with the US Men's National Team in January.  The injury would cause him to miss the start of the MLS season.  Starting Goalkeeper Matt Pickens, who was injured at the end of the 2012 season, would miss the start of 2013, as well.  The Rapids' 2012 assists leader, Martin Rivero, broke his foot during the first preseason game of 2013 in Tucson.  He would return to the lineup mid-season.  2012 leading goal scorer, Jaime Castrillón, required knee surgery and would be out until July.  The Rapids had initially been excited about the return of Pablo Mastroeni, agreeing to play on more season after missing almost all of 2012 with concussion symptoms.  His return was short lived, however, battling several injuries and seeing limited time before being traded to LA.

March 

The 2013 MLS season got off to a bad start with a 1–0 loss away to FC Dallas.  The deciding goal came early on a goalkeeping error by backup Steward Ceus.  The following week's home opener was delayed 1 day due to snow.  Colorado dropped the game 2–1 in their first ever loss to the Philadelphia Union.  Although recently signed by Philadelphia, Conor Casey did not play for his former team due to injury.  Colorado got their first point of the season on March 16, when they drew away to arch-rival Real Salt Lake.  During the Rocky Mountain Rivalry matchup at Real Salt Lake, Matt Pickens suffered a broken forearm in the 3rd minute of the game.  Twenty-one-year-old Clint Irwin would step into the starting Goalkeeper position in his absence.  Irwin would go on to set a record for facing a Penalty Kick in each of his 1st four MLS games, allowing only 2 goals. Irwin would also tie the MLS record for allowing only 5 goals in his first 10 games.  The Rapids lost the following game at LA Galaxy on a Mike McGee PK following a Drew Moor red card early in the 2nd half.  Diego Calderón injured his knee after he slid into the goal post clearing a shot off the goal line.  The injury would require surgery and several months to heal.  The injury would allow 23-year-old Chris Klute, on loan from the Atlanta Silverbacks (NASL), to step in and solidify the back line.  Klute would start 16 straight games at the Left Back Position, the first Rapids' player to do so since the start of 2010. On March 28, Colorado traded Andre Akpan to the New York Red Bulls for a conditional pick in 2015 MLS SuperDraft.  Colorado finished the month with a 2–2 home draw to Portland Timbers, the draw marked the first ever points dropped at home to Portland.

April 

April began with Colorado's first win of the season, 1–0 over Real Salt Lake at home with Atiba Harris scoring his first Rapids' goal.  The Rapids would make it 2 straight wins the next week after defeating Chivas USA 1–0 in LA on rookie Deshorn Brown's first goal.  The streak came to an end the following game as the Rapids lost to Seattle Sounders FC for a 7th consecutive time, losing 1–0 at home.  Colorado finished the month 2–1–1 after a 1–1 draw away to Houston Dynamo.  Once again, the Rapids missed facing one of their former stars as Omar Cummings missed the game.

May 

May began with a 1–0 home win over Toronto FC with Edson Buddle collecting his first goal in a Rapids' uniform.  Buddle made it 2 in a row the following week in a 2–0 win at Columbus Crew.  Colorado snapped a 3-game losing streak to San Jose Earthquakes with a 1–1 draw in San Jose on May 18.  Colorado rounded out the month with a 2–0 home win over Chivas USA.  Colorado finished May with an unbeaten record of 3–1–0, outscoring their opponents 6–1.

June 

Shane O'Neill left the Rapids during June to Participate in the 2013 U-20 World Cup in Turkey.  On June 17, the Rapids traded long-time Captain Pablo Mastroeni to the LA Galaxy for a 2nd round pick in the 2014 MLS SuperDraft and an International Roster Spot through the 2014 season.  Mastroeni is the Rapids all-time leader in Games and Minutes Played.  Colorado continued their unbeaten streak on June 1, with a 2–2 home draw with FC Dallas.  3 straight loses would follow, 2–1 home loss to San Jose Earthquakes, 2–1 away loss to Chicago Fire, and a 3–0 defeat away to Portland Timbers.  On June 29, Colorado beat Montreal 4–3 in their first ever meeting in Montreal.  The game featured 2 MLS Goal of the Week nominees by Montreal and would be considered by many as a Game of the Year nominee.

July 

Colorado beat New York Red Bulls 2–0 on July 4, improving their all-time record to 12–3–3 in July 4 games.  They continued their 4-game Eastern Conference swing with a 0–0 draw at home to D.C. United and a 2–1 victory at home over New England Revolution.  On July 20, Colorado drew at Seattle Sounders FC, taking their first ever point from CenturyLink Field.  July 27 would mark Pablo Mastroeni's bittersweet return to Colorado.  He received a warm reaction from the crowd, but his new club, LA Galaxy, fell 2–0.  Colorado would finish the month unbeaten, going 3–2–0, while scoring 7 goals and conceding 2.  The Rapids released Kevin Harbottle at the end of July.  The midfielder had been battling injury problems and had played in only 4 games since he was signed in the offseason.

August 

Taking a 6-game unbeaten streak (4–2–0) into August, the Rapids took back the Rocky Mountain Cup from Real Salt Lake after a 2–2 draw on August 3.  The game would also feature a 62-minute lightning delay during a heavy thunderstorm.  On August 6, Colorado signed Vicente Sánchez, a veteran of Mexican and German soccer, as an International Player.  On August 8, Colorado signed Gabriel Torres, who was coming off a very successful 2013 CONCACAF Gold Cup, as the club's first ever Designated Player.  The Rapids drew away to Chivas USA 1–1 on August 11.  The draw snapped the Rapids' 4 game winning streak at Chivas, in which they had shut out Chivas in all 4 games.  Vicente Sanchez made his MLS debut during the Chivas game.  Sanchez and Torres would both get their 1st MLS starts against Vancouver Whitecaps FC on August 17.  Colorado defeated Vancouver 2–0 in a battle of teams tied for 2nd place in the Western Conference Standings.  The win would also extend the Rapids unbeaten streak to a club record-tying 9 games.  The unbeaten streak would come to an end on the final day of August with a 2–1 defeat at Sporting Kansas City.

September 

The Rapids began September with a 1–0 victory over the Los Angeles Galaxy, who were missing several players due to international duty.  Edson Buddle scored his 98th career MLS goal against his former club.  Clint Irwin tied the club record for shutouts in a single MLS season with 10.  On September 14, Colorado saw Vicente Sánchez open his Rapids account in a 2–1 victory over FC Dallas.  Colorado lost the next game 1–0 away to Portland Timbers.

October 

Colorado began October with a 5–1 victory over Seattle Sounders FC, Colorado had only won once in 11 games against Seattle previously.  The game began with Deshorn Brown scoring his first of 2 goals on the night after just 13 seconds.  It was the fastest goal in Rapids history (passing Conor Casey's 16 second goal against LA in 2009) and the 2nd fastest goal in MLS history (Dwayne De Rosario scored in 11 seconds for San Jose against Dallas in 2003).  The game was finished with Gabriel Torres scoring his first MLS goal in stoppage time.  It was the most goals ever allowed by Seattle Sounders FC in an MLS game and most goals scored by Colorado since a 5–4 victory over New York Red Bulls in 2008.  Colorado followed that great performance with a terrible showing in a 1–0 defeat away to San Jose Earthquakes, leaving San Jose with a chance to overtake Colorado for the 5th and final playoff spot in the Western Conference.  Colorado rebounded with a 3–2 win over Vancouver Whitecaps FC, eliminating Vancouver from playoff contention.  New Rapids Forward Gabriel Torres scored twice, including the game winner in the 77th minute.  The win game Colorado its highest point total in club history and most wins and most goals scored since 1999 and 1998, respectively.  Colorado finished the regular season with a 9-game unbeaten streak at home (7W, 2D).  The 2013 Regular Season went out on a sour note, losing 3–0 in Vancouver behind a Camillo Sanvezzo hat trick.  It meant Colorado finished the regular season losing 3 straight road games, all by shutouts.  As a result, Colorado finished 5th in the Western Conference and had to travel to Seattle for the Knockout Round of the 2013 MLS Cup Playoffs.  Colorado would fall to Seattle 2–0 to end their 2013 MLS Season.

Club

Roster 
Updated August 13, 2013.

Technical Staff 
As of March 11, 2013.

Transfers

Transfers In

Transfers Out

Draft picks

Competitions

Preseason

MLS

MLS Cup Playoffs

Standings

Major League Soccer

Western Conference standings

Overall table 

Note: the table below has no impact on playoff qualification and is used solely for determining host of the MLS Cup, certain CCL spots, and 2014 MLS draft. The conference tables are the sole determinant for teams qualifying to the playoffs

Results summary

Results by round

Match results

U.S. Open Cup

Friendly

Statistics

Top scorers

Top assists

Goalkeeping

Disciplinary record
Includes all competitive matches. The list is sorted by position, and then shirt number.

Last updated: October, 2013Source: Competitive matches
Only competitive matches

Italic: denotes no longer with club.

References 

Colorado Rapids seasons
Colorado Rapids
Colorado Rapids
Colorado Rapids